Lee Ho-jung (born 20 January 1997) is a South Korean actress and model. She is best known for her roles in dramas Moon Lovers: Scarlet Heart Ryeo, Nevertheless, Let Me Introduce Her and Night Light. She also appeared in movies such as Hostage: Missing Celebrity, Midnight Runners and The Battle of Jangsari.

Life and career

1997–2015: Early life and career beginnings 

Lee Ho-jung was born on January 20, 1997, in South Korea. As a child she dreamt of pursuing a career as a flight attendant. Growing up, Lee had an interest for sports which included swimming and was often known for her athletic abilities in school. In middle school, Lee was considered short with a height of 153cm. Despite this, in eighth grade while watching Korea's Next Top Model, Lee believed she could someday become a fashion model, citing she could pose and express the designs of the products well despite her height not fitting the requirements of a runway model who averaged at 176cm. In ninth grade she faced a sudden growth spurt and grew 15cm and ultimately reached 170cm during high school. The recent turn of events prompted her friends to suggest a career in modelling, which Lee considered. Lee's resolve further strengthened upon seeing veteran model Jang Yoon-ju appear on Infinite Challenge and Jin Jung-sun on the second installment of Korea's Next Top Model who won the series as a teenager. Lee subsequently began to collect information on the career through a variety of magazines. After confirming an individual her age can become a model, she enrolled into a modelling academy afflicted with ESteem Models during the summer of 2011 and began her training.    

15-year-old Lee debuted in the modelling industry under ESteem Models through a magazine pictorial for Ceci. The opportunity arose when a fashion magazine editor recommended her to a veteran female model for its pictorial. Hong Jang-hyun, a well established photographer was skeptical on casting a young anonymous model until she started shooting photos of her. Since then, she has walked on designers' catwalks including Ko Tae-yong's Beyond Closet and Hong Hye-jin's The Studio K at Seoul Fashion Week. In May 2015, Lee signed a contract with YG KPlus.

2016–present: Acting and rising popularity 

Since her debut, Lee received many offers to appear as an actress. Loving her profession as a model, she denied to take acting lessons suggested by her company as she resented to rehearse and often skipped class. However, three to four years into her career, Lee began to slightly feel tired of the repetitive tasks that often came with the job. After watching the film Magic in the Moonlight by Woody Allen, Lee's mindset took a drastic turn and wanted to live as a character in the film. In result, she gained an interest in acting.

Personal life 
Lee completed her secondary studies at Hanlim Multi Art School majoring in the Fashion Model department in 2013.

Artistry

Fashion 
Her interest in fashion often extended to a hobby of reforming designs of clothing personally owned by her to her own style and taste. She would then sell them at second-hand clothing stores and use the income to purchase new clothes.

Influences 
Lee cited Kate Moss as a role model among models overseas due to their same height which she claims as "short" within the world of modelling. In the field of acting, Lee cites veteran actress Chun Woo-hee as a role model.

Other ventures

Philanthropy 
Lee alongside her mother participated in a donation campaign organized by Nylon Korea for single mothers in South Korea. The campaign pictorial included 10 pairs of celebrities and influencers which was published in the November issue of the magazine. Lee donated her entire modelling fee towards the campaign while funds were also raised by selling bags produced by the participants. Portion of the profits were donated to the Eastern Social Welfare Society.

Filmography

Film

Television series

Web series

Music video appearances

Awards and nominations

References

External links 

 
 

1997 births
Living people
21st-century South Korean actresses
South Korean television actresses
South Korean film actresses
South Korean web series actresses
Hanlim Multi Art School alumni